Themis Rigas (born 1945 - died 13 January 1984), popularly nicknamed The Train, was a Greek footballer born in Patras. One of the fastest and most talented wingers of his generation, he was a member of the great Panachaiki football team that impressed Greece in the seventies and qualified to the 1974 UEFA Cup. In 1974, he played abroad in the National Soccer League with Toronto Homer.

He died in a domestic accident in 1984, at the age of 39, leaving behind him the Panachaiki family without one of its most eminent members.

Statistics
Themis Rigas had 165 First Division appearances for Panachaiki and scored 23 goals.

References

Notes
Rsssf, website about football statistics

1945 births
1984 deaths
Panachaiki F.C. players
Greek footballers
Greek expatriate footballers
Toronto Blizzard (1971–1984) players
North American Soccer League (1968–1984) players
Expatriate soccer players in Canada
Greek expatriate sportspeople in Canada
Accidental deaths in Greece
Association football midfielders
Canadian National Soccer League players
Footballers from Patras